The Town of Lakeside is a Statutory Town in Jefferson County, Colorado, United States.  The town population was 8 at the 2010 United States Census, making Lakeside the least populous municipality in the State of Colorado.  Lakeside is immediately west of the City and County of Denver, the most populous municipality in the state.  The Denver Post Office (ZIP Code 80212) serves Lakeside.

The town's namesake lake is Lake Rhoda, which covers 20% of its total area. A year after its incorporation on November 12, 1907, the Lakeside Amusement Park, nicknamed "White City", opened on the eastern shores.  Both town and park were founded by a syndicate led by prominent Denver brewer Adolph Zang, who endeavored to build the resort just across the county line from Denver, and incorporated to move beyond the reach of Denver liquor laws. A shopping mall, Lakeside Center, was built in 1956 on the southern shore, but fell into financial troubles due to lack of business around the turn of the century and was converted into a Walmart and strip mall circa 2010. The amusement park, shopping area, and lake occupy almost all of the tiny municipality.  Residences are limited to a handful of houses in the southeast corner of the town occupied by employees of the amusement park.

Geography

Demographics

As of the census of 2000, there were 20 people, 9 households, and 5 families residing in the town.  There were 9 housing units. The racial makeup of the town was 100.0% White. 

There were 9 households, out of which 2 had children under the age of 18 living with them, 3 were married couples living together, and 4 were non-families. 2 of the households were made up of individuals, and none had someone living alone who was 65 years of age or older. The average household size was 2.22 and the average family size was 2.60.

As of the 2010 census, the population had dropped to 8. Racial demographics remained the same, with 100.0% of the population being White and no Hispanic or Latino individuals of any race. Every individual lived alone.

See also

Outline of Colorado
Index of Colorado-related articles
State of Colorado
Colorado cities and towns
Colorado municipalities
Colorado counties
Jefferson County, Colorado
Jefferson County R-1 School District
List of statistical areas in Colorado
Front Range Urban Corridor
North Central Colorado Urban Area
Denver-Aurora-Boulder, CO Combined Statistical Area
Denver-Aurora-Broomfield, CO Metropolitan Statistical Area

References

External links
CDOT map of the Town of Lakeside
Lakeside Mall Developer
 Lakeside, Colorado is at coordinates .

Towns in Jefferson County, Colorado
Towns in Colorado
Denver metropolitan area